Shahrdari Kerman Football Club is an Iranian football team based in Kerman, Iran.

Football clubs in Iran
Sport in Kerman Province